First Lady of Uzbekistan is the title attributed to the wife of the president of Uzbekistan. The current first lady of Uzbekistan is Ziroatkhon Hoshimova, wife of President Shavkat Mirziyoyev.

First ladies of Uzbekistan

See also 
 President of Uzbekistan

References 

First Ladies and Gentlemen of Uzbekistan
Uzbekistan
Uzbekistan politics-related lists